Paul Ngue (born 2 February 1988) is a Cameroonnian-born Hong Kong professional football player who currently plays as a forward for Hong Kong Premier League club HKFC.

International career
In 2016, he managed to get a HKSAR passport by switching his nationality from Cameroon to Hong Kong after living in Hong Kong for 7 years.

After becoming a Hong Konger, he made his international debut for the Hong Kong National Football Team during the AYA Bank Cup tournament on 3 June 2016, held in Myanmar.

External links
 Paul Ngue at HKFA
 

1988 births
Living people
People from Yaoundé
Hong Kong footballers
Hong Kong international footballers
Cameroonian footballers
Cameroonian emigrants to Hong Kong
Hong Kong First Division League players
Hong Kong Premier League players
China League One players
Xinjiang Tianshan Leopard F.C. players
Kitchee SC players
Tai Chung FC players
Southern District FC players
TSW Pegasus FC players
Hoi King SA players
Hong Kong FC players
Association football forwards
Naturalized footballers of Hong Kong
Hong Kong expatriate sportspeople in China